A throat-clear is a sound made at the back of the throat. 

The throat-clear is articulated as a single-syllable exclamation, written onomatopoeiacally as "hem"; or it may be articulated as a double-syllable sound, written as "ahem", which is expressed by inhaling slightly and then exhaling more forcibly.

Paralanguage
The deliberately executed throat-clear is a nonverbal, paralingual form of metacommunication. A loud, exaggerated throat-clearing noise may sometimes be used to get attention.

Upper respiratory
The throat-clear may be articulated consciously or unconsciously as a symptom of a number of laryngopharyngeal (upper respiratory tract) ailments.

Voice

Continual throat-clearing is a symptom of chronically dry vocal cords, caused by insufficiently produced amounts of mucus due to inadequate amounts of water and by excessive amounts of caffeine and alcohol.

References

Cough
Gestures